Raja Abhay Pratap Singh (7 December 1936 – 7 August 2013), also known as Bade Raja, was an Indian politician and member of parliament from the party Janata Dal. He represented 10th Loksabha of Pratapgarh constituency in Uttar Pradesh.

References 

People from Pratapgarh, Uttar Pradesh
Lok Sabha members from Uttar Pradesh
India MPs 1991–1996
1936 births
2013 deaths
Indian royalty
Indian National Congress politicians from Uttar Pradesh
Janata Dal politicians